The Hughes Range is a subrange of the Kootenay Ranges, located between the Bull and White rivers in the Kootenay Land District, British Columbia, Canada.

References

Mountain ranges of British Columbia
Kootenay Land District